Copiphora rhinoceros, the rhinoceros katydid, is a katydid found in Central America. It belongs to a group known as the conehead katydids and can be identified by a horn-like projection on the center of its head. The horn is used to ward off attacks from hungry bats. Unlike most katydids, which are herbivores, the rhinoceros katydid is an omnivore, feeding on fruit, seeds, invertebrates and small lizards. Its lifespan is one to two years.

It was first described in 1888 by Alphonse Pictet in his Locustides Nouveaux ou peu connus de Musée de Genève (New or Little-known Locusts of the Geneva Museum).

References

Conocephalinae
Insects described in 1888
Orthoptera of South America